Laverne or La Verne may refer to:

Places
 La Verne, California, a city
 University of La Verne, a private research university in La Verne
 Laverne, Oklahoma, a town

Other uses
 Laverne (name)

See also
Verne (disambiguation)